Fenerbahçe is the name of a neighbourhood in Kadıköy district, Istanbul, Turkey, located on the Asian side at the shore of the Sea of Marmara. The name means "lighthouse garden" in Turkish (from fener, meaning "lighthouse", and bahçe, meaning "garden"), referring to a historic lighthouse located at Fenerbahçe cape.

The neighbourhood has given its name to Fenerbahçe S.K., the professional sports club based in the area. However, the home stadium of the club, the Fenerbahçe Şükrü Saracoğlu Stadium, stands just outside the Fenerbahçe neighbourhood.

See also 

 Kalamış

References 

Neighbourhoods of Kadıköy